Kevin Balanta (born 28 April 1997) is a Colombian professional footballer who plays as a midfielder for Liga MX club Querètaro.

Honours 
Deportivo Cali
Superliga Colombiana: 2015

References

External links 

 
 

1997 births
Living people
Colombian footballers
Association football midfielders
Categoría Primera A players
Liga MX players
Deportivo Cali footballers
Club Tijuana footballers
Sportspeople from Santander Department
Colombia youth international footballers
Colombia under-20 international footballers
Colombia international footballers
Footballers at the 2016 Summer Olympics
Olympic footballers of Colombia
Colombian expatriate footballers
Expatriate footballers in Mexico
Colombian expatriate sportspeople in Mexico